"Mary" is a song by Australian singer songwriter Monique Brumby. It was released in September 1996 as the second single for her debut studio album, Thylacine (1997).

At the ARIA Music Awards of 1997, the track was nominated for two awards. It won 'ARIA Award for Best Female Artist'. David Bridie lost out for 'Producer of the Year' to Charles Fisher

Track listing
 "Mary"	
 "Nothing's Ever The Way You Think It's Gonna Be" 
 "That's Me"	
 "Fool For You" (Acoustic Version)
 "Mary" (Acoustic Version)

References

Monique Brumby songs
1996 singles
ARIA Award-winning songs
Sony Music Australia singles
1996 songs